Theoretical Biology and Medical Modelling is a peer-reviewed online-only medical journal covering mathematical and theoretical biology, as well as on applications of mathematics in the field of medicine. It was established in 2004 and is published by BioMed Central. The editor-in-chief is Prof. Hiroshi Nishiura (Kyoto University). According to the Journal Citation Reports, the journal has a 2021 impact factor of 2.432.

References

External links

Publications established in 2004
BioMed Central academic journals
English-language journals
Mathematical and theoretical biology journals
General medical journals
Online-only journals